The 1986–87 season of the Moroccan Throne Cup was the 31st edition of the competition.

Kawkab Marrakech won the cup, beating Renaissance de Berkane 4–0 in the final, played at the Stade Mohamed V in Casablanca. Kawkab Marrakech won the competition for the fourth time in their history.

Tournament

Last 16

Quarter-finals

Semi-finals

Final 
The final featured the two winning semi-finalists, Kawkab Marrakech and Renaissance de Berkane, on 7 September 1987 at the Stade Mohamed V in Casablanca.

Notes and references 

1986
1986 in association football
1987 in association football
1986–87 in Moroccan football